Parafossarulus crassitesta is an extinct species of freshwater snail with gills and an operculum, an aquatic prosobranch gastropod mollusk in the family Bithyniidae.

Glöer (2002) reassigned two European extinct species of Parafossarulus as a subgenus of the genus Bithynia, but genus Parafossarulus is generally accepted for Asian species.

Distribution 
This species occurred in Europe in the Pleistocene Epoch.

References

External links 

Bithyniidae
Prehistoric gastropods
Gastropods described in 1885